The 2013 Japan Sevens was the second edition of the tournament and the seventh tournament of the 2012–13 IRB Sevens World Series. The host stadium was the Chichibunomiya Rugby Stadium.

South Africa won the title by defeating New Zealand 24–19 in the final.

Format
The teams were divided into pools of four teams, who played a round-robin within the pool. Points were awarded in each pool on a different schedule from most rugby tournaments—3 for a win, 2 for a draw, 1 for a loss.
The top two teams in each pool advanced to the Cup competition. The four quarterfinal losers dropped into the bracket for the Plate. The Bowl was contested by the third- and fourth-place finishers in each pool, with the losers in the Bowl quarterfinals dropping into the bracket for the Shield.

Teams
The participating teams are:

Pool stage
The draw was made on 24 March 2013.

Pool A

Pool B

Pool C

Pool D

Knockout stage

Shield

Bowl

Plate

Cup

References

External links

Japan Sevens
Sevens
Japan Sevens